Ihosy  is a city (commune urbaine) with 283,047 inhabitants (2015) in Ihorombe Region in central south Madagascar. 

Ihosy is the capital of Ihorombe Region, as well as of the district of  Ihosy.

Geography
Ihosy is an important crosspoint for the southern part of Madagascar.
It is crossed by the Route nationale 7 from the capital Antananarivo (600 km) (-Fianarantsoa (191 km) to Toliara (325 km) and startpoint of the Route nationale 13 to Tolagnaro and Route nationale 27 to Farafangana (271 km). It is located on the Ihosy River and has a regional airport: Ihosy Airport.

Religion
Roman Catholic Diocese of Ihosy seated in the cathedral of St. Vincent de Paul.
 FJKM - Fiangonan'i Jesoa Kristy eto Madagasikara (Church of Jesus Christ in Madagascar)
 FLM - Fiangonana Loterana Malagasy (Malagasy Lutheran Church)
 EEM Eklesia Episkopaly Malagasy (Anglican Church of Madagascar)

Points of interest
 The Isalo National Park is located near Ihosy and Ranohira in a distance of 80 km by the Route nationale 7 .
 The caves of Andranomilitry, 10 km from the city in direction of Toliara
 Pic d'Ivohibe Reserve - (110 km)

Roads
National road 7 - from Fianarantsoa to Toliara.
National road 13 - from Ihosy to Fort Dauphin
National road 27 - from Ihosy to Farafangana (272 km, unpaved)

References

Populated places in Ihorombe
Regional capitals in Madagascar